Clay pan may refer to

Claypan, a dense layer in the subsoil with high clay content 
Clay playa, a type of dry lake